The Russian monitor Admiral Greig was the second and last of the two s built for the Imperial Russian Navy in the late 1860s. She was assigned to the Baltic Fleet upon completion and remained there for her entire uneventful career. She was reclassified as a coast-defense ironclad in 1892 before she became a training ship later that decade. Admiral Greig was decommissioned in 1907, stricken from the Navy List in 1909 and scrapped in 1912.

Design and description

The ships were designed to displace , but turned out to be overweight and actually displaced . They were fitted with a plough-shaped ram. Their crew consisted of 269–74 officers and crewmen. The Admiral Lazarev-class ships had a single two-cylinder horizontal direct-acting steam engine that drove a single propeller, using steam provided by four rectangular fire-tube boilers.

Armament
The monitors were originally designed to be armed with six 20-caliber Obukhov  rifled muzzle-loading guns, a pair in each Coles-type turret. Around 1874–1875 the guns were replaced by three 17-caliber, 11-inch rifled guns, based on a Krupp design. During the Russo-Turkish War of 1877–1878, a 9-inch mortar was fitted to attack the thin deck armor of enemy ships, but accuracy was poor and they were later removed, probably in the early 1880s. A more powerful, 22-caliber, 11-inch gun was installed aboard Admiral Greig and her sister ship  during the 1880s.

By the early 1890s, Admiral Greigs light armament consisted of one  Baranov QF gun, five  QF Hotchkiss guns, replacing the 4-pounders, and a pair of  QF Hotchkiss five-barreled revolving cannon. The monitors could also carry 12–15 mines intended to be used to create a secure anchorage.

Armor

Construction and service
Admiral Greig, named for Admiral Samuel Greig, was ordered in 1865 from the New Admiralty Shipyard, Saint Petersburg. Construction began on 1 September although the formal keel-laying was not until 10 May 1866. Construction was delayed by changes to the design and late deliveries of components. She was launched on 30 October and then transferred to Kronstadt for fitting out as the shallow waters around Saint Petersburg prevented deep-draft ships from being completed. This added more delays as the dockyard there lacked the equipment to efficiently fit out the ships, and she officially entered service in 1872 at the cost of 1,596,700 rubles.

The ship was assigned to the Baltic Fleet upon completion, but Admiral Greig was not fully equipped until around 1872. The ship had her boilers replaced in 1881–1882 and again around 1900–1903, possibly with cylindrical boilers. She was reclassified as a coast-defense ironclad on 13 February 1892 and frequently served with the Artillery Training Detachment of the Baltic Fleet. Admiral Greig was transferred to the Port of Kronstadt on 31 March 1907 and was stricken on 22 December 1909. The ship was scrapped in Saint Petersburg in 1912. One source suggests that she and her sister , and the two s, were used as floating piers for the railroad bridge over the Svir River during the construction of the Saint Petersburg–Murmansk Railroad in 1916 before being scrapped in the 1920s.

Notes

Footnotes

References

Further reading
 
 

Ships built at Admiralty Shipyard
Admiral Lazarev-class monitors
1867 ships